Abstract Principles Taken to Their Logical Extremes is the only album by Dark Heresy, a death metal band from London, England, released in 1995 on the Greek label Unisound.

The album was remastered by Jaime Gomez Arellano and re-released by Svart Records on CD and Double Gatefold Vinyl.  The re-release features updated artwork and a comprehensive booklet with flyers, lyrics and interviews.

Track listing
 "Engines of Torture" – 4:00
 "The Last Temptation of Pan" – 8:00
 "The Ceremony" – 7:39
 "Thy Blood" – 9:45
 "Ofermod" – 7:05
 "Hole" – 5:45
 "The Millstone" – 7:54
 "Tyler's Stand" – 10:22

Personnel
Kola: Vocals
Arnold: Guitars, Keyboards, Piano
Hans: Bass
Wooj: Drums, Percussion

1995 debut albums
Dark Heresy albums